Nicola Bagnolini (born 14 March 2004) is an Italian professional footballer who plays as a goalkeeper for Bologna.

Club career
Bagnolini first started playing football by joining the academy of Cesena, aged 10, before moving to Bologna in 2018. He signed his first professional contract with Bologna in December 2020, and then worked his way up their youth categories, subsequently making his professional debut for the club on 21 May 2022, as he came on as a late substitute for Francesco Bardi in a 1–0 Serie A win over Genoa.

International career
Bagnolini was included in the Italian under-18 squad that took part in the 2022 Mediterranean Games in Oran, Algeria, with the Azzurrini eventually winning the silver medal after losing 1–0 against France in the final match.

References

External links
 
 Tuttocalciatori Profile

2004 births
Living people
People from Cesena
Italian footballers
Bologna F.C. 1909 players
Serie A players
Association football goalkeepers
Sportspeople from the Province of Forlì-Cesena
Footballers from Emilia-Romagna
Mediterranean Games silver medalists for Italy
Mediterranean Games medalists in football
Competitors at the 2022 Mediterranean Games
21st-century Italian people